All in This Tea is a 2007 documentary film co-directed by Les Blank and Gina Leibrecht, about Chinese tea. It follows the American tea connoisseur David Lee Hoffman as he travels to remote tea-growing areas of China. Hoffman attempts to interest Chinese tea growers and distributors in fair trade issues, and explores the importance of terroir and organic growing methods in both the quality and future sustainability of the Chinese tea market.

The film premiered at the San Francisco International Film Festival in 2007.

Production
The documentary was filmed with a hand-held camera on digital video and is 70 minutes in length.

Critical response
On Rotten Tomatoes, the film has a rating of 83%, based on 12 reviews, with an average rating of 7/10. As well as entertainment ratings, All in This Tea has been subject to some praises of those in the industry as well as those in the academic world. For example, Kim Stanton, of the University of North Texas Libraries, writing for the Educational Media Reviews Online writes that she "highly recommends" it for those with an interest for food studies, anthropology, business studies, environmental science and studies on modern China.  Les Blank and Gina Leibrecht are regularly praised for their passion on the subject.

See also
Garlic Is as Good as Ten Mothers

References

External links

All In This Tea at San Francisco International Film Festival site

2007 documentary films
2007 films
American documentary films
Chinese tea
Documentary films about agriculture
Documentary films about food and drink
Films directed by Les Blank
Films shot in China
Works about tea
2000s English-language films
2000s American films